is a 1996 vertical-scrolling shooter that combines the features in Sonic Wings, Sonic Wings 2, and Sonic Wings 3. It was ported to arcade as Sonic Wings Limited (Aero Fighters Special in North America). It runs on a Sony ZN-1 JAMMA board.

Gameplay

Fighters
There are 7 teams, 14 pilots, and 26 fighters in this game, with each team consisting of 2 members, and a choice of 2 fighters per pilot, except the secret team, which has 1 fighter per pilot.

Once a player has chosen a team, the other player can only choose a pilot and fighter of the respective team.

A pilot's secret fighter is unlocked by completing the game with the chosen pilot.

The NATO and Secret teams are unlocked by unlocking all secret fighters in the US, Japan, Russia, Sweden, and P.K.F. teams.

Stages
There are 17 stages in this game, but only 9 are playable at a time. After completing stage 1, 3 stages are randomly chosen out of 5. The game includes a branching system that allows players to choose 1 of 2 branches after completing stages 5, 7, or 8.

If a secret fighter is chosen, alternate versions of the stages appear instead.

PlayStation version
It allows saving the game for more than once per round, while the PAL version does not support the PS1 Memorycard at all.

Arcade version
There are 6 teams, 12 pilots, and 12 fighters in this version. There are 10 stages but only 7 are playable per game. After completing Stage 4, Stage 5 and 6 are chosen depending on the player's performance. After completing Stage 6, one of Fight in Orbit, Another Dimension, or Mars becomes Stage 7, depending on the player's performance. In Fight in Orbit, Another Dimension, 1 of 2 different final bosses appear in the end. If all lives are lost in Stage 7, continuing causes the game to start at the beginning of a stage. If one of the five last stage bosses is not defeated before it escapes, a boss-specific failure ending is shown. A character-specific ending is shown if the final Stage 7 boss is defeated, and a stage-specific ending is shown. After an item is revealed, the point value of the item increases the longer it stays on screen. The point value progresses at the sequence of 100, 200, 500, 1000, 2000, 4000, and 10000 (maximum) points.

Reception

Notes

References

External links
Sonic Wings Special at MobyGames
Sonic Wings Limited at the Killer List of Videogames

1996 video games
2004 video games
Arcade video games
PlayStation (console) games
Sega Saturn games
Vertically scrolling shooters
Video games developed in Japan
Video games featuring female protagonists
Video games scored by Soshi Hosoi
THQ games
Video System games
Cooperative video games
Multiplayer and single-player video games